Ankumbura is a village in Sri Lanka. It is located within Central Province, in Kandy district. It has been bounded by Matale and Kurunegala districts. It is connected to Katugastota via Poojapitiya and Ambatenna. It is also connected to Hedeniya on Kandy Kurunegala road.

See also
List of towns in Central Province, Sri Lanka

External links

Populated places in Kandy District